Howard Russell Hickok (November 26, 1870 – July 7, 1926) was a United States Army officer in the late 19th and early 20th centuries. He served in World War I, among other conflicts.

Biography
Hickok was born on November 26, 1870, in Florida, Missouri. He graduated from the United States Military Academy in 1892.

Hickok was commissioned into the 9th Cavalry Regiment, serving in the Northwestern U.S. and in Arizona and New Mexico. He served on duty with the U.S. National Guard in Pennsylvania and Washington, D.C., in 1904. He then served in the District of Alaska, and later in the Philippines, participating in both the Philippine–American War and the Moro Rebellion. Hickok graduated from the Infantry and Cavalry School with honors in 1906. After serving with the provisional government of Cuba from 1906 to 1970, he graduated from the United States Army Command and General Staff College. He also served on the national guards of various states, including Indiana, Georgia, Florida, Mississippi, and West Virginia.

Hickok was promoted to the rank of colonel on August 5, 1917, and became the Chief of Staff of the 5th Infantry Division, serving in Europe because of World War I. On June 26, 1918, he was promoted to brigadier general, and he returned to the U.S. to assume command of the 19th Infantry Brigade of the 10th Division in Camp Funston. After the war's end, Hickok commanded the Arizona District and then served at Fort Bliss with the 7th Cavalry Regiment. He attended the United States Army War College in 1920 and then commanded the 4th Cavalry Regiment at Fort Brown. He then served as the Sixth Corps Area inspector in Chicago.

Hickok became ill and was hospitalized for six months. He was at the Army–Navy General Hospital at Hot Springs, Arkansas, and then at Walter Reed Army Medical Center. He died on July 7, 1926. While dying at his permanent rank of colonel, Congress restored his brigadier general rank in June 1930. He is buried at Arlington National Cemetery.

Personal life
Hickok married Anna Elizabeth Whitbread, who was from Syracuse, New York.

References

Bibliography

1870 births
1926 deaths
People from Monroe County, Missouri
United States Army generals of World War I
United States Army generals
United States Military Academy alumni
United States Army Command and General Staff College alumni
United States Army War College alumni
Military personnel from Missouri